Rijmenam is a village located in the Belgian province of Antwerp and is part of the municipality of Bonheiden.

History 
The area around Rijmenam had been settled since the Roman era. A chapel has been known to exist since the 11th chapel. Rijmenam used to belong the Duchy of Brabant. In 1578, the Battle of Rijmenam was fought between the Dutch States Army and the Spanish forces over control of Mechelen. The village was almost complete destroyed, and rebuilt twenty years later. It used to be an agricultural community, but during the 20th century, it became a residential area.

Rijmenam has a triangle-shaped open space with tilia trees, which was used for trials by the Franks.

Rijmenam used to be an independent municipality. In 1977, it was merged into Bonheiden except for the hamlet  which became part of Putte.

Gallery

References

External links
 
  

Populated places in Antwerp Province
Bonheiden